Taymur Jumblatt (born 1982) is a political leader of Lebanon's Druze Community.

Biography
Taymur was born in 1982. He is the son of the leader Walid Jumblatt and grandson of Kamal Jumblatt.

Taymur took over the power from Walid Jumblatt in March 2017. The handover was done at 40th anniversary of Kamal Jumblatt’s assassination at a ceremony where Walid placed a traditional keffiyeh scarf on Taymur's shoulders.

He was educated at the American University of Beirut (BA in political science), and Sorbonne University, France, (MA in political science).

He is married to Diana Zu'ytar who descends from a Shiite family based in the Beqaa Valley.

Career 
In 2011, he was raised to second in command of the Progressive Social Party.

In 2018, he succeeded his father as leader of Progressive Socialist Party. In the May 2018 elections, he was elected a member of the Lebanese Parliament, representing the Shouf-Aley district in Mount-Lebanon Governorate. He is a member of the World Economic Forum.

References 

People from Chouf District
Lebanese Druze
Lebanese people of Iranian descent
Progressive Socialist Party politicians
Lebanese politicians of Kurdish descent
1982 births
Living people
Members of the Parliament of Lebanon